The 1978–79 season was the 80th completed season of the Football League.

Bob Paisley won his third league title at Liverpool as his side fought off competition from Nottingham Forest and West Bromwich Albion. Albion were in their first season under the management of Ron Atkinson, and pulled off a famous 5–3 away win over Manchester United with a team that included Bryan Robson, Brendan Batson, Cyrille Regis and Laurie Cunningham.

The three relegation places went to Queens Park Rangers, Birmingham City and Chelsea. QPR had declined since the departure of Dave Sexton in 1977 and were relegated just three years after finishing runners-up in the league. Meanwhile, Chelsea's manager Danny Blanchflower paid for his team's shortcomings by losing his job.

Money dominated the headlines during the season: Trevor Francis became England's first million-pound footballer after joining Nottingham Forest from Birmingham City. Liverpool became one of the first English clubs to have a shirt sponsor when they agreed a sponsorship deal with the Japanese hi-fi manufacturers Hitachi.

Crystal Palace won the Second Division title, followed by Brighton & Hove Albion, who were promoted to the top division for the first time, and third-placed Stoke City. Going down were Sheffield United, Millwall and Blackburn Rovers.

Shrewsbury Town were champions of the Third Division. The other two promotion spots were occupied by Watford and Swansea City. Peterborough United, Walsall, Tranmere Rovers and Lincoln City were relegated to the Fourth Division.

Reading, Grimsby Town, Wimbledon and Barnsley occupied the Fourth Division promotion places. The success came for Wimbledon in only their second season as a league club.

Final league tables and results

The tables and results below are reproduced here in the exact form that they can be found at The Rec.Sport.Soccer Statistics Foundation website and in Rothmans Book of Football League Records 1888–89 to 1978–79, with home and away statistics separated.

During the first five seasons of the league, that is, until the season 1893–94, re-election process concerned the clubs which finished in the bottom four of the league. From the 1894–95 season and until the 1920–21 season the re-election process was required of the clubs which finished in the bottom three of the league. From the 1922–23 season on it was required of the bottom two teams of both Third Division North and Third Division South. Since the Fourth Division was established in the 1958–59 season, the re-election process has concerned the bottom four clubs in that division.

First Division

Bob Paisley guided Liverpool to their third league title in four seasons with the highest points total (68), best home record (40 points from 21 games) and highest goals scored to conceded ratio (85 scored, 16 conceded, ratio 5.3:1) ever attained in First Division history. Nottingham Forest built on their first league title triumph by winning the European Cup and retaining the League Cup under the management of Brian Clough, who in February signed striker Trevor Francis from Birmingham City in Britain's first million-pound transfer, although Forest finished eight points behind Liverpool in second place. West Bromwich Albion's first full season under Ron Atkinson brought an impressive third-place finish and a run to the quarter-finals of the UEFA Cup, as well as a famous 5-3 victory over Manchester United at Old Trafford just after Christmas.

Everton and Leeds United completed the top five. Seventh placed Arsenal compensated for a lack of a title challenge by beating Manchester United 3-2 in a memorable final of the FA Cup.

Chelsea, Birmingham City and QPR were relegated, while Derby County (champions just four years ago) only narrowly stayed up.

Results

Managerial changes

Maps

Second Division

Crystal Palace continued to excel under the management of Terry Venables as their exciting young team finished top of a hotly contested Second Division promotion race, a point ahead of Brighton (in the First Division for the first time) and Stoke City. Sunderland missed out on promotion by a single point.

Newcastle United and Leicester City surprisingly failed to feature in the Second Division promotion race.

Blackburn Rovers, Millwall and Sheffield United went down to the Third Division.

Results

Maps

Third Division

Results

Maps

Fourth Division

Results

Maps

See also
 1978-79 in English football

References

Ian Laschke: Rothmans Book of Football League Records 1888–89 to 1978–79. Macdonald and Jane’s, London & Sydney, 1980.

 
English Football League seasons
1